Sandra Palmer may refer to:
 Sandra Palmer (golfer)
 Sandra Palmer (entrepreneur)
 Sandra Palmer (24 character)